Savory or Savoury may refer to:

Common usage
 Herbs of the genus Satureja, particularly:
 Summer savory (Satureja hortensis), an annual herb, used to flavor food
 Winter savory (Satureja montana), a perennial herb, also used to flavor food, but less common than summer savory
 Savory of Crete (Satureja thymbra), an evergreen herb native to Eurasia, formerly used in seasoning food

Food
 In Western cuisine, food that is considered suitable for a main course or other non-dessert course is called savory as opposed to sweet
 Savoury (dish), a small savoury dish, traditionally served towards the end of a formal meal in some European cuisine
 Savory (ice cream), a brand of ice cream from Nestlé
 Savoury pattie, a battered and deep fried disc of mashed potato, seasoned with sage
 Savoury pie, pies with savoury ingredients, as opposed to sweet pies
 Umami, also called savoriness, one of the basic tastes detected by the human tongue.

People
 Allan Savory (born 1935), Zimbabwean environmentalist, inventor of the Savory brittleness scale
 Brett Alexander Savory (born 1973), Canadian writer
 Charles Savory (1889–1915), New Zealand rugby league footballer
 Douglas Savory (1878–1969), Ulster Unionist Party Member of the United Kingdom Parliament
 Gerald Savory (1909–1996), English playwright and screenwriter
 Henry Savory (1914–2008), English cricketer
 James Henry Savory (1855–1903), English clergyman, a Double Blue, cricketer, and footballer
 Joseph Savory (1843–1931), Sheriff of London, Lord Mayor of London, and MP
 Reg Savory (1908–1989), New Zealand businessman and politician
 Lieutenant-General Sir Reginald Savory (1894–1980), British Indian Army Officer
 Michael Savory (born 1943), Lord Mayor of London for 2004-05
 Nathaniel Savory (1794–1874), American colonist to the Bonin Islands
 Nirvana Savoury, musician
 Roger Savory, Iranologist and specialist on the Safavids
 Sir William Savory, 1st Baronet (1826–1895), a British surgeon
 William Savory (1916–2004), audio engineer

Other uses
 "Savory" (song), a 1994 single by the band Jawbox

See also
 
 
 Savery, a surname
 Savor (disambiguation)
 Savory Creek, Western Australia